The Slovenian identity card is issued to Slovenian citizens. It can be used as a travel document when visiting countries in Europe (except Belarus, Russia, Ukraine and United Kingdom), as well as Georgia, French overseas territories and Montserrat (for max. 14 days)

Physical appearance

The words REPUBLIKA SLOVENIJA (English: Republic of Slovenia) are inscribed next to the coat of arms and the words Osebna izkaznica (English: Identity card) and Identity Card are inscribed below. Identity cards issued in officially bilingual areas of Slovenia also have Italian or Hungarian text next to the Slovene. These are REPUBBLICA DI SLOVENIA and Carta d’identità in Italian and SZLOVÉN KÖZTÁRSASÁG and Személyi igazolvány in Hungarian.

See also
 National identity cards in the European Union

References

Slovenia
Identity card